Catherine Dorion is a Canadian politician from Quebec, who was elected to the National Assembly of Quebec in the 2018 provincial election. She represented the electoral district of Taschereau as a member of Québec solidaire (QS) from 2018 to 2022. Dorion is aligned with Option nationale, a pro-independence faction that is a "collective" within QS.

Biography
Dorion was born in Quebec in 1982. Her father, Louis Dorion, who died in 1998, was a lawyer from Quebec City; her mother, Claudette Brasseur, was a court reporter. She grew up in the Saint-Jean-Baptiste neighbourhood of Quebec City and was the last of nine children. Her grandfather was Noel Dorion, a Progressive Conservative (PC) Member of Parliament (MP) for Bellechasse riding. She has two daughters.

Dorion is a graduate of the Conservatoire de musique et d'art dramatique du Québec. She also received a bachelor's degree in International Relations and International Law from Université du Québec à Montréal, in 2009, and a master's degree in Political Science from King's College London, in 2010.

Career

Acting
As an actress, Dorion has performed in several television dramas and theatre productions, including L'Auberge du chien noir. Her performance in Amélie Nothomb's Fuels at the Théâtre du Trident, earned her the 2007 Prix Révélation of the Year Award at the Gala des Masques.

She also performs slam poetry, has won several competitions, and has been a regular guest artist at the Francofolies de Montréal.

Writing
She was a columnist at the Carrefour de Québec (2012-2016) and at Update - Québec (2016). She also collaborated on a show for Radio-Canada (2015) and has written blogs for Le Journal de Montréal and Le Journal de Québec (2016-2018).

In 2013, Dorion produced a micro-documentary on immigrants and Quebec sovereignty.

She has published several written works including Même s'il fait noir comme dans le cul d'un ours (2014), and two collections of poems, FUCK TOUTE (2016) and The NoShow (2015 and 2017).

In the essay Les luttes fécondes. Libérer le désir en amour et en politique, she defends polyamory, which she herself practices, and discusses the revolutionary potential of desire, which, left free, is for her a means of deconstructing institutions.

She published the youth novel Ce qui se passe dehors, which tells the story of high school students in Quebec who engage in politics.

In an article for Le Journal de Québec, she advocates for nudity in the locker rooms of public swimming pools.

Politics
Dorion was elected as Member of the National Assembly (MNA) for Taschereau, 1 October 2018, as the candidate for Québec Solidaire.

On 8 November 2019, Dorion was barred from the Blue Room of the Legislative Assembly of Quebec for dress code violations. Examples of her wardrobe included t-shirts and Doc Martens shoes and an orange hoodie that drew criticism previously. Speaker François Paradis notified Québec Solidaire leader Gabriel Nadeau-Dubois of complaints. Speaking to the media, Deputy speaker Chantal Soucy said, "we have a decorum to respect, we reminded her of it several times, it was time to draw a line".

On 1 April 2022, she announced she will not be running for re-election in the 2022 election.

Electoral record

* Result compared to Action démocratique du Québec.

Bibliography
2008: Quand le sage pointe la lune, le fou regarde le doigt, co-author of the company Soucide collective. Directed by Marc Doré at the Théâtre Périscope (Québec).
2009: Viva Pinoshit, directed by Olivier Lépine at Théâtre Premier Acte (Québec).
2010: Kounadia , story presented in the play We are made (like rats), by the company of pensive Biches. Directed by Alexia Burger at the Cinémathèque québécoise (Montreal).
2011: Kukipik , a clown theater, co-author of the company Soucide collectif. Directed by Marc Doré at Théâtre Premier Acte (Québec).
2011: Two texts in J'aurais voté oui mais j'étais trop petit, Editas.
2011-function. : several articles in the journals Liberté , Relations, Quebec Journal of International Law, Public Ethics, National Action, Qui vive, as well as in major Quebec dailies.
2012: "Le lieu collectif", in "Notre indépendance", Stanké.
2012: NOUS? , monologue presented by the Moulin des lyres collective.
2014: Même s'il fait noir comme dans le cul d'un ours, poetry, Cornac.
2017: Les luttes fécondes. Libérer le désir en amour et en politique, Workshops 10, Canadian Essays category.
2018: Ce qui se passe dehors, youth novel, Hurtubise.

References

Living people
Actresses from Quebec City
Alumni of King's College London
Université du Québec à Montréal alumni
Politicians from Quebec City
Québec solidaire MNAs
Women MNAs in Quebec
21st-century Canadian politicians
Option nationale candidates in Quebec provincial elections
21st-century Canadian actresses
21st-century Canadian poets
21st-century Canadian dramatists and playwrights
21st-century Canadian novelists
Canadian television actresses
Canadian stage actresses
Canadian women poets
Canadian women dramatists and playwrights
Canadian women novelists
Canadian writers of young adult literature
Polyamory
Writers from Quebec City
21st-century Canadian women writers
1982 births
Activists from Quebec
21st-century Canadian women politicians
Polyamorous people